The 2020 League of Ireland Premier Division, known as the SSE Airtricity League for sponsorship reasons, was the 36th season of the League of Ireland Premier Division.

The league began on 14 February 2020 and concluded on 9 November 2020. The fixtures were announced on 20 December 2019. The season was halted in mid-March because of the COVID-19 pandemic in the Republic of Ireland following the directive of the Irish government and the Football Association of Ireland. The FAI subsequently announced a contingency plan with a view to completing the domestic season at a later date with a reduced number of games. It resumed on 31 July. On 24 October, Finn Harps won 2–0 at Bohemians which meant Shamrock Rovers won the league and Cork City were relegated.

Overview
The Premier Division consists of 10 teams. Ordinarily each team plays each other four times for a total of 36 matches in the season. Following a meeting of the Football Association of Ireland regarding the COVID-19 pandemic, it was decided that the season would be played on an 18-match basis with teams playing each other twice: once at home and once away.

Shelbourne, the 2019 First Division champions, were promoted to the league for the first time since 2013, replacing fellow Dublin side UCD, who were relegated to the League of Ireland First Division after finishing bottom of the league in 2019.

Teams

Stadia and locations

Personnel and kits

Note: Flags indicate national team as has been defined under FIFA eligibility rules. Players may hold more than one non-FIFA nationality.

Managerial changes

League table

Standings

Positions by round

The table lists the positions of teams after each week of matches. In order to preserve chronological evolvements, any postponed matches are not included in the round at which they were originally scheduled but added to the full round they were played immediately afterward.

Results
Teams will play each other twice (once at home, once away).

Season statistics

Top scorers

Hat-tricks

Play-offs

First Division play-off Semi-finals

First Division play-off Final

Promotion/relegation play-off

Source:

Awards

Monthly awards

Annual awards

See also
 2020 League of Ireland First Division
 2020 FAI Cup
 2020 League of Ireland Cup
 2020 Bohemian F.C. season
 2020 Dundalk F.C. season
 2020 Shelbourne F.C. season
 2020 St Patrick's Athletic F.C. season

Notes

References

External links
 Official website
 Full Results and Fixtures

 
1
League of Ireland Premier Division seasons
1
Ireland
Ireland
League of Ireland